Owen Martin Phillips (December 30, 1930 – October 13, 2010) was a U.S. physical oceanographer and geophysicist who spent most of his career at the Johns Hopkins University.

Early life 

Owen Phillips was born at Parramatta, New South Wales, Australia a suburb of Sydney, the son of Richard Keith and Madeline Constance (née Lofts) Phillips. His father fought in the Gallipoli Campaign during World War I. In 1936 the family moved to the country town of Tamworth where most of his primary education occurred.

Education

He entered the University of Sydney in the fall of 1948. He majored in applied mathematics and physics, graduating with first-class honours in 1952 and sharing the John Coutts Prize for general proficiency in science with J.Stewart Turner. He then moved to the famed Cavendish Laboratory at Cambridge University, from which he received his Ph.D.

Professional work

With the exception of a brief stint in the Department of Applied Mathematics and Theoretical Physics at Cambridge, most of Phillips career was spent at the Johns Hopkins University in Baltimore, Maryland. His early career was largely concerned with the physics of the upper ocean, particular regarding ways in which energy was transferred from the wind into the ocean interior. A particularly important paper in this respect was his 1957 work in the Journal of Fluid Mechanics, proposing that ocean surface waves were the generated by turbulent eddies in the atmosphere being swept over the surface in such a way that they resonated with surface disturbances.,.  In later work he developed a mathematical theory that built on ideas of resonance for explaining how energy in waves was transferred from short to large scales. He also worked on understanding how this energy was transferred to the ocean mixed layer, thus constraining the amount of stirring within this layer (Kato and Phillips, 1969). He was awarded the 1974 Sverdrup Gold Medal of the American Meteorological Society "for his outstanding studies of both wave phenomena and turbulence in the upper ocean, and in particular for his contributions to the theory of ocean-wave generation."

In addition to primary area of scientific research, Phillips worked to synthesize knowledge within the broader field of geophysics in a number of books. In 1965 he published a monograph on the dynamics of the upper ocean which received the Adams Prize from the Royal Society. Translated into Russian and Chinese, with a second edition appearing in 1977, it was an important textbook in a field which at the time had few such works.  He also worked with others in the Johns Hopkins department to study flow in porous media, publishing an important monograph on this subject in 1991.

Honors and awards

 Adams Prize (1964)
 Fellow of the Royal Society (1968)
 Sverdrup Gold Medal Award (1974)
 Fellow of the American Meteorological Society (1980)
 Elected U.S. National Academy of Engineering (1998)
 Fellow of the American Geophysical Union (2006)

Select publications

See also
Wind wave
Mixed layer

Notes

References

External links
 Full bibliography 

American geophysicists
American oceanographers
Johns Hopkins University faculty
Fellows of the Royal Society
1930 births
2010 deaths
Sverdrup Gold Medal Award Recipients
Fellows of the American Meteorological Society